Giacomo Bellei (born 7 February 1988) is an Italian volleyball player. Since the 2018/2019 season, he has played for Conad Reggio Emilia.

Sporting achievements

Clubs 
Italian SuperCup:
  2006
CEV Challenge Cup:
  2016

National Team 
Junior European Championship:
  2006

References

External links
 Giacomo Bellei at LegaVolley
 Giacomo Bellei at Volleybox
 

1988 births
Living people
Italian men's volleyball players